Hyperion Bay is an American drama television series that ran for one season on The WB from September 21, 1998 to March 8, 1999. The series was partially filmed in Humboldt County, California, in the cities of Trinidad, Eureka, and Ferndale.

Synopsis
The series centers around Dennis Sweeny (Mark-Paul Gosselaar) who, after a successful career in the computer software business, returns home to open a local division for the company he works for. The series follows the drama when the new meets the old in the little coastal town of Hyperion Bay, California.

Cancellation
According to series writer and co-producer Jeffrey Stepakoff, early into Hyperion Bay'''s run the network told producers to make the show more hip and with a quicker pace. When series producer and creator Joseph Dougherty refused, he was fired by Warner Bros, and former Melrose Place producer Frank South was brought in to retool the series. Carmen Electra was added to the cast as Sarah Hicks, a character modeled after Heather Locklear's character, Amanda Woodward, on Melrose Place.

The changes did not improve ratings and The WB canceled Hyperion Bay'' in February 1999, with the last episodes airing in March 1999.

Cast
Mark-Paul Gosselaar as Dennis Sweeny
Dylan Neal as Nick Sweeny
Sydney Penny as Jennifer Worth
Christina Moore as Amy Sweeny
Bart Johnson as Nelson Tucker
Chaka Forman as Marcus Fox
Cassidy Rae as Trudy Tucker
Cindy Pickett as Marjorie Sweeny
Carmen Electra as Sarah Hicks
Daya Vaidya as Emily

Episodes

Awards and nominations

References

External links
  
 

1998 American television series debuts
1999 American television series endings
1990s American drama television series
American television soap operas
English-language television shows
Serial drama television series
Television series by Warner Bros. Television Studios
Television shows set in California
The WB original programming